Mudéjar (also  , ,  , ; from ) refers to the group of Muslims who remained in Iberia in the late medieval period despite the Christian reconquest.  It is also a term for Mudejar art, which was much influenced by Islamic art, but produced typically by Christian craftsmen for Christian patrons.

Mudéjar was originally the term used for Moors or Muslims of Al-Andalus who remained in Iberia after the Christian Reconquista but were not initially forcibly converted to Christianity or exiled. The word Mudéjar references several historical interpretations and cultural borrowings. It was a medieval Castilian borrowing of the Arabic word Mudajjan , meaning "subjugated; tamed", referring to Muslims who submitted to the rule of Christian kings. The term likely originated as a taunt, as the word was usually applied to domesticated animals such as poultry. The term Mudéjar also can be translated from Arabic as "one permitted to remain", which refers to the Christians allowing Muslims to remain in Christian Iberia.

Another term with the same meaning,  ("people who stay on"), was used by Muslim writers, notably al-Wansharisi in his work Kitab al-Mi'yar. This protected status suggested subjugation at the hands of Christian rulers, as the word  resembled  meaning "tame animals". Muslims of other regions outside of the Iberian Peninsula disapproved of the Mudéjar subjugated status and their willingness to live with non-Muslims.

Mudéjar was used in contrast to both Muslims in Muslim-ruled areas (for example, Muslims of Granada before 1492) and Moriscos, who were forcibly converted and may or may not have continued to secretly practice Islam.

The Treaty of Granada (1491) protected religious and cultural freedoms for Muslims in the imminent transition from the Emirate of Granada to a Province of Castile. After the fall of the last Islamic kingdom in the Battle of Granada in January 1492, the Mudéjars, unlike the Jews who were expelled that same year, kept a protected religious status, although there were Catholic efforts to convert them. However, over the next several years, their religious freedom deteriorated and they were increasingly persecuted.

Islam was outlawed in Portugal by 1497, the Crown of Castile by 1502, and the Crown of Aragon by 1526, forcing the Mudéjars to convert or, in some cases, leave the country. Following the forced conversions, they faced suspicions that they were not truly converted but remained crypto-Muslims, and were known as Moriscos. The Moriscos, too, were eventually expelled, in 1609–1614.

Mudéjar social status in Spain

Castile 
The Muslim population in Castile originally immigrated from Toledo, Seville and other Andalusi territories. They were not original to the land in Castile. Muslim immigration into Castile was sponsored settlement by the Kingdom of Castile. It is hypothesized that the slow-growing Christian population demonstrated a need to bring more people into Castile. Primary documents written by Castilians in the 13th century indicate that Muslims were able to maintain some agency under Christian rule. The Mudéjars were able to maintain their religion, their laws, and had their own judges. The Mudéjars in Castile spoke the same Romance languages and dialects as their Christian neighbors.

Aragon and Catalonia 

Like the Mudéjars in Castile, Aragonese and Catalan Mudéjars also spoke the Romance languages of their Christian counterparts. However, unlike the Mudéjars in Castile, there were Muslim villages in Aragon and, to a lesser extent, in south-western Catalonia which populated the land before the Christian reconquests, setting up a history of Muslim cultivation and population of the land. Besides the large Muslim populations in Granada and Valencia, the Aragonese Muslim peasants were the most well-established Muslim community in the region, while in Catalonia Muslim authoctonous presence was limited only to the Low Ebro and Low Segre areas. Aragonese and Catalan Muslims were under the jurisdiction of the Christian Crown and were designated a special status. This status applied to the Mudéjar cultivators, the exarici, and this status made them subservient to their Christian superiors because by law; they were required to cultivate the land of royal estates. However, this status was also beneficial as the law suggested that this land be passed down through Muslim family members. Despite their expulsion at the end of the Morisco period, the Mudéjars in Aragon left evidence of their style in architecture, while in Catalonia only some reminiscences of this can be appreciated in some Gothic churches and cathedrals in some shires of Lleida.

Lleida in Catalonia was, besides Tortosa, the only major Catalan town to have a Muslim quarter, at which its numerous Muslim population of Andalusi origins, was organized as a community (Aljama or Al-Jama'ah), even though there were also Muslims living outside the quarter. Its Muslim population descended from the population that did not leave Madinat Larida when it was taken over from the Moors by the counts of Urgell and Barcelona. The autochthonous Muslim community, largely composed of a mix of skilled artisans, laborers, and peasants, although progressively diminishing throughout the Middle Ages by emigration to the neighbouring Kingdom of Aragon, to the nearby increasingly powerful and numerous Aljamas of Aitona and Serós, and to Islamic countries (Al-Hijrah) as well as by increasing conversions to Christianity, was nevertheless also being reinforced by immigration of Navarrese and Aragonese Muslims (Mudéjares) and by intermittent arrivals of Valencian, Granadan, and North African origin, these being mostly slaves or former slaves. The quarter and its Aljama or community enjoyed a special status within the social reality of the city, with its own elites: Alfaquins, Cadís and Sabasales (Al-Fuqaha, Al-Qudat and Ashab As-Salat, that is, Islamic scholars, Islamic Judges and Imams respectively); Escrivans (Scrives); Alamins (Al-'Amin), or officials that represented the Aljama before the king (in case of the royal Aljamas) or the feudal lords (in case of the rural manor Aljamas), etc. The Morería had its Mosque (Al-Masjid), its baths (Al-Hammam), its cemetery (Al-Maqbara, in the outskirts of the city), its Halal butchery, its market or Assoc (As-Suq) and its bakery. The Aljama suffered a period of decadence throughout the late Middle Ages, leading to its progressive reduction in numbers and privileges, up to the forced conversions of the late medieval period, and finally its total expulsion from the city during the early modern period.

Valencia 
In the 13th century, the Aragonese Christians conquered Valencia. Unlike in Aragon and in Catalonia, the Mudéjar population in Valencia vastly outnumbered Christians in the area. In Valencia, the majority of communities were peasant, Arabic-speaking and Muslim. Although there was a disparity between Christians and Muslims, it is important to note that a Christian king ruled over Valencia, and not a sultan or an imam and this shaped the experience of Mudéjars in this region. An effect of Christian rule were the outbreaks of rioting against Mudéjars in Valencia. Mudéjar communities were frequently attacked by Christian rioters, despite being protected by the Crown. Violence against Mudéjars in Valencia was common.

See also
 Mozarabs

References

Sources
 
 

Islam in Spain
Moriscos